The Alekseev–Gröbner formula, or nonlinear variation-of-constants formula, is a generalization of the linear variation of constants formula which was proven independently by Wolfgang Gröbner in 1960 and Vladimir Mikhailovich Alekseev in 1961. It expresses the global error of a perturbation in terms of the local error and has many applications for studying perturbations of ordinary differential equations.

Formulation 

Let  be a natural number, let  be a positive real number, and let  be a function which is continuous on the time interval  and continuously differentiable on the -dimensional space . Let ,  be a continuous solution of the integral equation

Furthermore, let  be continuously differentiable. Then it holds that

The Alekseev–Gröbner formula allows to express the global error  in terms of the local error .

The Itô–Alekseev–Gröbner formula 

The Itô–Alekseev–Gröbner formula is a generalization of the Alekseev–Gröbner formula which states in the deterministic case, that for a continuously differentiable function  it holds that

References 

Nonlinear algebra
Ordinary differential equations